The Pan-African Ocean is a hypothesized paleo-ocean whose closure created the supercontinent of Pannotia.  The ocean may have existed before the break-up of the supercontinent of Rodinia. The ocean closed before the beginning of the Phanerozoic Eon, when the Panthalassa ocean expanded, and was eventually replaced by it.

See also

References

Historical oceans
Proterozoic paleogeography